The Firebird Sub-One is a German single-place, paraglider that was designed and produced by Firebird Sky Sports AG of Füssen in the mid-2000s. It is now out of production.

Design and development
The Sub-One was designed as a beginner glider and intended for the school market for use in flight training. The models are each named for their relative size.

Variants
Sub-One S
Small-sized model for lighter pilots. The glider model is DHV 1 certified.
Sub-One M
Mid-sized model for medium-weight pilots. The glider model is DHV 1 certified.
Sub-One  L
Large-sized model for heavier pilots. The glider model is DHV 1 certified.

Specifications (Sub-One S)

References

Sub-One
Paragliders